Asparrena (meaning 'down the rock') is a municipality located in the province of Álava, in the Basque Country, northern Spain. The municipality comprises various population nuclei, the main one being the town of Araia.

See Also
 Ilarduia

References

External links
 ASPÁRRENA in the Bernardo Estornés Lasa - Auñamendi Encyclopedia 

Asparrena